Alexandre "Alex" Dupont (born 3 September 1985) is a Canadian wheelchair racer. His right leg was amputated after he had a motorcycle accident when he was 17; he took up racing at the age of 18. Classified as a T54 athlete, he won bronze in the 1500 m at the 2014 Commonwealth Games in Glasgow.

References

External links 
 
 
 

1985 births
Living people
Canadian male wheelchair racers
Paralympic track and field athletes of Canada
Paralympic bronze medalists for Canada
Athletes (track and field) at the 2012 Summer Paralympics
Athletes (track and field) at the 2016 Summer Paralympics
Medalists at the 2016 Summer Paralympics
Commonwealth Games medallists in athletics
Commonwealth Games gold medallists for Canada
Commonwealth Games bronze medallists for Canada
Athletes (track and field) at the 2014 Commonwealth Games
Athletes (track and field) at the 2018 Commonwealth Games
Paralympic medalists in athletics (track and field)
Medalists at the 2015 Parapan American Games
21st-century Canadian people
Medallists at the 2014 Commonwealth Games
Medallists at the 2018 Commonwealth Games